Variovorax is a Gram-negative and motile genus of bacteria from the family Comamonadaceae.

References

Comamonadaceae
Articles containing video clips
Bacteria genera